The 2011 Duquesne Dukes football team represented Duquesne University as a member of the Northeast Conference (NEC) during the 2011 NCAA Division I FCS football season. The Dukes were led by seventh-year head coach Jerry Schmitt and played their home games at Arthur J. Rooney Athletic Field. They finished the season 9–2 overall and 7–1 in NEC play to share the conference championship with Albany. However, Albany claimed the conference automatic bid to the NCAA Division I Football Championship playoffs due to their head to head victory, and the Dukes did not receive an at-large bid.

Schedule

References

Duquesne
Duquesne Dukes football seasons
Northeast Conference football champion seasons
Duquesne Dukes football